Amlakhi is a town in Karbi Anglong district, Assam, India.

Geography
It is located at an elevation of 150 m above MSL.

Location
Nearest railway station is at Diphu and the nearest airport is Dimapur Airport.

Places of interest
Amlakhi is close to Barpathar, an archeological site where the remains of an 8th-century temple made of square bricks and a stone inscription of Brahmi characters from 5th century were excavated.

References

External links
 Satellite map of Amlakhi
 About Amlakhi

Cities and towns in Karbi Anglong district